Mikhaylovka is a rural locality (a selo) in Ivanovsky Selsoviet, Khaybullinsky District, Bashkortostan, Russia. The population was 148 as of 2010. There are 3 streets.

Geography 
Mikhaylovka is located 42 km northwest of Akyar (the district's administrative centre) by road. Ivanovka is the nearest rural locality.

References 

Rural localities in Khaybullinsky District